Limnephiloidea is a superfamily of Trichoptera, the caddisflies. Please see the taxonomy details on the right of this page for further details.

Insect superfamilies
Integripalpia